The 1987 Seoul Open was a men's tennis tournament played on outdoor hard courts that was part of the 1987 Nabisco Grand Prix. It was the inaugural edition of the tournament and was played at Seoul in South Korea from April 20 through April 27, 1987. Second-seeded Jim Grabb won the singles title.

Finals

Singles

 Jim Grabb defeated  Andre Agassi 1–6, 6–4, 6–2
 It was Grabb's 1st title of the year and the 1st of his career.

Doubles

 Eric Korita /  Mike Leach defeated  Ken Flach /  Jim Grabb 6–7, 6–1, 7–5
 It was Korita's only title of the year and the 1st of his career. It was Leach's only title of the year and the 4th of his career.

References

External links
 ITF tournament edition details

 
Seoul Open
Seoul Open